Legal terrorism may refer to:
State-sponsored terrorism
State terrorism, terrorism carried out by the state itself
Vexatious litigation, the filing of lawsuits to harass or censor